Elections to Kesteven County Council were held on Saturday, 5 March 1952. Kesteven was one of three divisions of the historic county of Lincolnshire in England; it consisted of the ancient wapentakes (or hundreds) of Aswardhurn, Aveland, Beltisloe, Boothby Graffoe, Flaxwell, Langoe, Loveden, Ness, and Winnibriggs and Threo. The Local Government Act 1888 established Kesteven as an administrative county, governed by a Council; elections were held every three years from 1889, until it was abolished by the Local Government Act 1972, which established Lincolnshire County Council in its place.

The county was divided into 60 electoral divisions, each of which returned one member. In 1952 there were contests in 13 of these, eight of which saw no change; Labour gained 4 seats.

Results by division

By-elections

Leadenham and Ruskington, May 1954 
Cllrs S. J. Edwards (Leadenham) and A. J. Hosack (Ruskington) resigned prompting elections in their divisions. Polling took place on 22 May 1954. The results for Leadenham were:
 Henry Pryor Kelway, chartered accountant and merchant, of The Green, Fulbeck (Independent), 336 votes
 Reginald Edgar Burnett, railway engine driver, of 29 Staunton St, Grantham (Labour), 329 votes
For Ruskington:
 Benjamin E. Brighton, farmer, of Ruskington (Independent), 843 votes
 Eric Arthur Skins, cook, of Ruskington (Labour), 245 votes
Hence, Kelway and Brighton were elected. The Leadenham electorate numbered 1,171, meaning the turnout was approximately 57%. The number of registered voters in Ruskington was 1,702, and the turnout was 65%.

Corby and Navenby, July 1954 
The elevation of the Earl of Ancaster (Corby) to the aldermanic bench, and the death of R. A. Mason (Navenby) prompted by-elections. Polling took place on 3 July 1954.

References 

1952
1952 English local elections
March 1952 events in the United Kingdom
20th century in Lincolnshire